Johanna Miia Maria Halkoaho (born 13 January 1977 in Suodenniemi) is a Finnish 100m hurdler and long jumper. She is 165 cm (5'5") tall, and weighs 55 kg (121 lb), and trains with Suodenniemen Urheilijat. Her highest honours include two medals at the 1996 World Junior Championships, a bronze in long jump and a silver in heptathlon. She is also the national indoor champion in the 60 meters hurdles and long jump in 2003, 2004 & 2006 national champion in 100 meters hurdles.

Halkoaho's 100 meters hurdles personal best is 13:23, which she achieved in Lappeenranta on 21 July 2005 with a 0.2 m/s wind. Her 2006 season best is 13:24, which she achieved in Helsinki on 26 July 2006 in the IAAF Grand Prix GE Money Grand Prix, with a 0.6 m/s wind.

Halkoaho's long jump personal best is 6.79 meters, which she achieved in Budapest on 28 August 1998 with a 0.2m.s wind. She has not competed in the long jump in the 2006 season but her best from 2005 was 6.21, her best jump aside from her PB in 1998 is 6.63 meters, which came on 13 July 2003 in Lapinlahti (1.5 m/s wind).

Trivia 
She has a younger sister called Jenniina, who is also an athlete.

Competition record

Notes and references

External links

1977 births
Living people
People from Sastamala
Finnish female long jumpers
Finnish female hurdlers
Sportspeople from Pirkanmaa
20th-century Finnish women
21st-century Finnish women